This is a list of films released by the British studio Stoll Pictures, one of the largest European studios of the 1920s. It excludes films made in other countries but distributed in the United Kingdom by Stoll.

1910s

1920s

1930s

See also
 List of Two Cities Films
 List of British and Dominions films
 List of Gainsborough Pictures films
 List of Ealing Studios films
 List of British Lion films
 List of British National films
 List of General Film Distributors films
 List of Paramount British films

References

Bibliography
 Low, Rachael. History of the British Film, 1918-1929. George Allen & Unwin, 1971.

Stoll Pictures films
Stoll Pictures